Darío Lionel Lecman (born September 1, 1971 in Buenos Aires) is a retired male weightlifter from Argentina. He twice competed for his native country at the Summer Olympics: 2000 and 2004. Lecman won three silver medals in a row at the Pan American Games: 1995, 1999 and 2003.  He is Jewish.

References

External links 
 
 

1971 births
Living people
Argentine male weightlifters
Olympic weightlifters of Argentina
Weightlifters at the 2000 Summer Olympics
Weightlifters at the 2004 Summer Olympics
Weightlifters at the 1995 Pan American Games
Weightlifters at the 1999 Pan American Games
Weightlifters at the 2003 Pan American Games
Sportspeople from Buenos Aires
Argentine Jews
Jewish Argentine sportspeople
Jewish weightlifters
Pan American Games silver medalists for Argentina
Pan American Games medalists in weightlifting
Medalists at the 1995 Pan American Games
20th-century Argentine people
21st-century Argentine people